Pentrefelin Halt railway station was a station on the Swansea District line in Wales. It opened on 16 April 1928, and closed on 11 June 1956.

References

Former Great Western Railway stations
Railway stations in Great Britain opened in 1928
Railway stations in Great Britain closed in 1956